Zonites algirus is a species of air-breathing land snail, a terrestrial pulmonate gastropodmollusk in the family Zonitidae.

Distribution
This species occurs in Turkey, southern France and other areas.

References

Zonites
Gastropods described in 1758
Taxa named by Carl Linnaeus
Fauna of France
Invertebrates of Turkey